Gollapudi Srinivas Award is a national-level private award given to a first-time director in Indian Cinema every year. It is given out in the memory of Gollapudi Srinivas (3 March 1966 – 12 August 1992). He was the youngest son of veteran Telugu film personality Gollapudi Maruthi Rao. This award was first announced in 1997 at Chennai.

Gollapudi Srinivas Memorial Foundation
While directing his début Telugu film Prema Pustakam, Gollapudi Srinivas succumbed to a water accident on August 12, 1992. The Telugu film industry lost a promising director. The Maruthi Rao family established the Gollapudi Srinivas Memorial Foundation to perpetuate the memory and instituted an annual cash award for the Best Début Director chosen from among Indian-language films. As part of the event, an eminent Indian film personality gives the keynote lecture.

Awards

References

External links
 

Indian film awards